Curtin Winsor Jr. (born April 28, 1939) is a former Ambassador of the United States to Costa Rica.

Biography
Winsor was born in Philadelphia, Pennsylvania, on April 28, 1939, and graduated from Brown University in 1961 with a degree in English literature. Following his undergraduate studies, he received a master's degree in Latin American studies in 1964, and his Ph.D. in international studies in 1971, from the School of International Service at American University in Washington, D.C. After a stint as an academic researcher, he joined the United States Foreign Service in 1967, and from 1971 to 1973, he worked as an assistant to Senator Robert Dole of Kansas. Winsor subsequently worked for Chase Manhattan Bank and several non-profit concerns focusing on international and free-trade issues.

Winsor w as a foreign-policy adviser to former California Governor Ronald Reagan in his successful 1980 presidential campaign. Following the 1980 campaign, President Reagan sent him as Special Emissary to the Middle East. From 1983 to 1985, he was the United States Ambassador to Costa Rica. He was involved with several non-profit boards, including those of the William H. Donner Foundation, the Donner Canadian Foundation, the Hudson Institute, the Atlas Economic Research Foundation, and the Media Research Center, as well as the National Council of the American Council of Trustees and Alumni.

Winsor is the founder and owner of the American Chemical Services Company of Marmet, West Virginia, which has produced chemicals for the control of dust and frozen coal for coal mines and coal users since 1981. He is the chairman of the advisory board of Intellaine, LLP, a U.S. defense and risk engineering firm located in Arlington, Virginia.

External links
 Biography of Curtin Winsor, Hudson Institute
 Biography of Curtin Winsor, American Ambassadors
 http://www.intellaine.com

1939 births
Living people
Brown University alumni
Ambassadors of the United States to Costa Rica
Employees of the United States Senate
Reagan administration personnel
American University School of International Service alumni
Hudson Institute
United States Foreign Service personnel